Acrobatty Bunny is a 1946 Warner Bros. Looney Tunes short directed by Robert McKimson. The short was released on June 29, 1946, and stars Bugs Bunny and Nero the Lion. This was the first cartoon McKimson directed that starred Bugs Bunny.

Plot

A circus is being set up just above Bugs' rabbit hole, causing much noise and vibration. The lion cage is set up directly above the hole, and the lion takes deep sniffs (alternatively yanking Bugs towards the hole or throwing him back) to determine that the animal below is Bugs. When the lion (whom Bugs eventually refers to as "Nero") roars again, Bugs comes to the surface to see what's going on, riding an elevator that makes twists and turns. Bugs tries to reason with the lion, but soon makes a hasty escape when Nero takes a swipe at him.

Nero manages to get out of his cage, and chases Bugs around the circus grounds. Bugs at one point ducks into a dressing room, coming out as a clown trying to convince Nero to laugh, which he eventually does — until Bugs takes some whacks at the lion with a wooden board. The lion then chases Bugs into the big top, where they swing around acrobat swings. Eventually, Bugs tricks Nero into a cannon and sets the cannon off, causing Nero to do a hula in his 'skirt', plays the ukulele. ("We're also available for picnics, lodge meetings, children's parties, and smokers!")

Reception
Animation critic Jerry Beck writes, "Nonstop action and gags, Acrobatty Bunny is a pure Bugs Bunny cartoon, demonstrating what the rabbit does best: using his brains to heckle an aggressive bully and stay one step ahead of his opponent. Robert McKimson's very first Bugs Bunny cartoon is one of the funniest ever made."

Home media
The cartoon can be found on the Looney Tunes Golden Collection: Volume 3 DVD. It is also available on the Marx Brothers' Night in Casablanca DVD (2004).

References

External links

1946 films
1946 short films
1946 animated films
Looney Tunes shorts
Warner Bros. Cartoons animated short films
Films directed by Robert McKimson
Circus films
Bugs Bunny films
Animated films about lions
1940s Warner Bros. animated short films